At least three ships of the Royal Netherlands Navy have been named HNLMS Van Kinsbergen after Admiral Jan Hendrik van Kinsbergen (1735–1819):

 , was a sloop-of-war of the Royal Netherlands Navy that served in World War II.
 , third of the s, entered service in 1980.
 , training vessel for the Royal Netherlands Navy, entered service in 1999.

Royal Netherlands Navy ship names